Charles Ridgely usually refers to Charles Carnan Ridgely (1760–1829), Governor of Maryland, United States.

Charles Ridgely may also refer to:

 Charles Ridgely II ("Charles the Merchant", 1702–1772), planter, merchant, and ironmonger, son of Charles Ridgely I ("Charles the Planter")
 Charles Ridgely III ("Charles the Mariner", 1733–1790), son of Charles Ridgely II
 Charles G. Ridgely (1784–1848), naval officer, nephew of Charles Ridgely III
 Charles G. Ridgely, assemblyman for Kent County at the 4th Delaware General Assembly, 1779
 Charles Ridgely (1838–1872), son of Eliza Ridgely, grandson of Charles Carnan Ridgely
 Charles Sterrett Ridgely (1782–1847), American land developer and legislator, great-nephew of Charles Ridgely III